Benson Lee (born November 3, 1969) is a Korean American filmmaker who has worked in drama, documentary, and commercial production for over twenty years.

Education
Lee attended or graduated from the University of Hawaii, New York University and the Fashion Institute of Technology.

Career

Documentaries 
His first documentary, Planet B-Boy, was one of the top-grossing theatrical documentaries of 2008 in the US. His work has aired on HBO, MTV, the Sundance Channel, and has been theatrically distributed to over 30 countries worldwide.

Lee is also working on One Korea 3D, a documentary about a concert for peace (modeled after Live Aid) that will hold simultaneous concerts in both South and North Korea on the same day. This concert will take place in the Fall of 2014.

Narrative films 
In 1998, with his first feature film Miss Monday, Lee became the first Korean-American filmmaker to be accepted to the Dramatic Competition of the Sundance Film Festival where his film was awarded a Special Grand Jury Prize for Best Actor.

In 2011, Lee directed the 3D Hollywood adaptation of Planet B-Boy titled Battle of the Year for Sony Pictures / Screen Gems, which stars Josh Holloway, Laz Alonso, and Chris Brown. The film was released September 20, 2013.

In 2015, Lee completed the film Seoul Searching, an 80s Teen Comedy about a group of diverse Korean high school teens from around the globe, coming together in 1986 to experience the most important summer of their lives. They meet at a special summer camp in Seoul where they were sent by their parents to learn what it means to be Korean; a side to them they know little about. Although the intentions of the camp were honorable, the activities of the teens were not. The film made its premiere as an official selection of the 2015 Sundance Film Festival, and also stars Justin Chon and Jessika Van.

Filmography 
Miss Monday (1998)
Planet B-Boy (2007)
Battle of the Year (2013)
Seoul Searching (2015)

References

External links 

New York Times Review of 'Planet B-Boy'
TimeOut London, 'Battle of the Year'
Josh Holloway, Laz Alonso and Chris Brown Lead 'Planet B Boy' Cast
Variety 'Planet B-Boy' Review
Planet B-Boy Rottentomatoes

1969 births
Living people
American film directors of Korean descent
American male screenwriters
American film producers
Screenwriters from California